Eucharitolus is a genus of beetles in the family Cerambycidae, containing the following species:

 Eucharitolus bellus (Melzer, 1927)
 Eucharitolus depressus Botero & Monne, 2012
 Eucharitolus dorcadioides (White, 1855)
 Eucharitolus geometricus (Tippmann, 1960)
 Eucharitolus lecossoisi Audureau & Demez, 2015
 Eucharitolus lituratus (Melzer, 1934)
 Eucharitolus longus Botero & Monne, 2012
 Eucharitolus pulcher Bates, 1885
 Eucharitolus spilotus Botero & Monne, 2012

References

Acanthocinini